Whitehouse railway station was a station in Whitehouse, Aberdeenshire. It opened with the along with the rest of the Alford Valley Railway line from Kintore to Alford in 1859 and closed in 1950.

References

Disused railway stations in Aberdeenshire
Former Great North of Scotland Railway stations
Railway stations in Great Britain opened in 1859
Railway stations in Great Britain closed in 1950
1859 establishments in Scotland
1950 disestablishments in Scotland